is a Japanese politician serving in the House of Representatives in the Diet (national legislature) as an independent. A native of Ōta, Tokyo and graduate of the University of Tokyo he was elected for the first time in 1996.

Career
Taki was appointed as Minister of Justice under the second cabinet of prime minister Yoshihiko Noda on 4 June 2012. On 1 October 2012, he was replaced by Keishu Tanaka. After Tanaka was tainted by scandals relating to political donations and organized crime links, Taki was reappointed to the position on 24 October 2012. He left office on 26 December 2012.

References

External links 
  Official website in Japanese.
 House of Representatives: Representative's profile in Japanese
 Kantei/Cabinet of Japan: Makoto Taki in Japanese, English

|-

|-

|-

|-

|-

|-

|-

1938 births
People from Ōta, Tokyo
Living people
University of Tokyo alumni
Democratic Party of Japan politicians
Liberal Democratic Party (Japan) politicians
Members of the House of Representatives (Japan)
Ministers of Justice of Japan
New Party Nippon politicians
Noda cabinet
Politicians from Tokyo
21st-century Japanese politicians